The Pandoras Pass,  also Brennans Gap and Pandora's Pass is a mountain pass across the Warrumbungle Range, a spur off the Great Dividing Range, located in the Coolah Tops National Park in northwestern New South Wales, Australia.

The area was first explored by Europeans in 1823 by the botanist and explorer Allan Cunningham. The pass allowed an easy passage through the mountain range to the Liverpool Plains on the northern side of the mountain range. The exploration journey commenced from Bathurst in April 1823.

Today the pass is a lightly used gravel road with the main traffic through the mountain range passing through other routes, such as the New England Highway to the east and the Black Stump Way to the west.

European discovery
After receiving Governor Brisbane's approval for the exploration Cunningham left Sydney on 31 March 1823, crossing the Nepean River on his way to Bathurst. Arriving at Bathurst he made final preparations for the journey and departed north on 15 April. He took with him five servants and "five strong packhorses" to carry their provisions. Cunninhams party passed through Dabee, now known as Rylstone, reaching the Goulburn River on 6 May 1823. Now the southern edge of the Liverpool Range was only  to the north and he proceeded there. He reached Mount Macarthur (now Mount Moan) Cunningham now sought a passage through the range and decided to move east along the bottom of the range. After realising the range was becoming more difficult he "halted on the verge of a perpendicular ravine, being unable to advance another mile to the eastward by reason of the sharp water gullies between which lay steep ravines". He returned to Mount Moan, the fruitless journey east costing three weeks and three days. They proceeded north west again searching for a passage through the Liverpool Range. After a further six days Cunningham decided to mount the western range and take his bearings.

Cunningham named the pass Pandora's Pass, (now also known as Brennan's Gap) and that he "believed it would become the great route of communication between Bathurst and Hunter River and the Liverpool Plains." He returned via present day Mudgee to the town of Bathurst arriving there on 27 June 1823 after an arduous eleven weeks travelling.

Etymology

In his diary Cunningham described the difficulties and many privations of finding this pass, and he says 'and in spite of these little evils - a hope at the bottom', he then names it Pandoras Pass. This is a reference to the Greek myth of Pandora's box, this myth refers to a vessel which contained all the evils of the world. When Pandora opened the jar, all its contents except for one item were released into the world. The one remaining item was hope.

Cunningham's diary

The following memorandum, written on parchment, was enclosed in a bottle, and buried under a marked tree in the Pandora Pass:

See also

 List of mountain passes in New South Wales

References

External links 
Diary extract of Allan Cunningham - Gutenberg Australia Website
The Allan Cunningham Project - Website

Mountain passes of Australia
Central West (New South Wales)